Haasiella is a fungal genus in the family Hygrophoraceae. It is a monotypic genus that contains only the species Haasiella splendidissima. Haasiella venustissima, formerly considered to be a distinct species based on its one and two-spored basidia, was found by a DNA study to be synonymous with H. splendidissima. H. splendidissima is only known from Europe and is saprotrophic on wood. Haasiella was described as a new genus in 1966 by Czech mycologists František Kotlaba and Zdeněk Pouzar. It is most closely related to the genus Hygrophorus.

The genus name is in honour of Hans Haas, a German mycologist, who was a specialist on Agaricus from Schnait near
Stuttgart.

See also
List of Agaricales genera

References

Hygrophoraceae
Agaricales genera